Luke Eugene Carroll-Burgess (born 3 March 1999) is an English professional footballer who plays as a midfielder for National League club Oldham Athletic.

Club career
Burgess joined Wigan Athletic in 2013, after progressing through the Everton youth ranks. After signing his first professional deal in the 2017–18 pre-season, Burgess made his Wigan debut during their EFL Cup tie against Blackpool, which resulted in a 2–1 victory for the Latics.

In March 2018 Burgess joined Chorley on loan for the rest of the season, and scored his first senior goal in a 3–2 win over Clitheroe in the final of the Lancashire FA Challenge Trophy.

On the eve of the 2018–19 season Burgess joined Barrow on an initial 28 day loan. Burgess scored during an FA Cup tie against former club Chorley, but Barrow lost the match 3–2. In January 2019 he extended his loan spell at Barrow until the end of the season. At the end of March he was recalled from loan.

He was offered a contract beyond May 2019 by the club.

In January 2020 he joined Salford City. and was named in the match day squad on 21 January against Accrington Stanley in a Football League Trophy match. He was confirmed as a member of the club's development team for the 2020–21 season and that he would be on going out on loan to AFC Fylde until January 2021. On 4 October, Burgess scored on his Fylde début, scoring in the last minute of a 4–2 victory against Hyde United in an FA Cup qualifying match. In October, he returned to Salford early, and made his first start for the club on 21 November against Bradford City, opening the scoring in the eighth minute before scoring a solo goal just before half-time, which was said to be reminiscent of Salford co-owner Ryan Giggs and described as a "moment of brilliance".

He was released by Salford at the end of the 2021–22 season.

On 28 June 2022, Burgess joined recently relegated National League club Oldham Athletic on a two-year contract.

Career statistics

Honours
Salford City
EFL Trophy: 2019–20

References

External links

1999 births
Living people
Footballers from Liverpool
English footballers
Association football midfielders
Wigan Athletic F.C. players
Chorley F.C. players
Barrow A.F.C. players
Salford City F.C. players
AFC Fylde players
Oldham Athletic A.F.C. players
National League (English football) players
English Football League players